Griffiths House was a Methodist children's home and hostel that operated in Alice Springs, in the Northern Territory of Australia, from 1945 - 1965. It was for children from remote areas of Central Australia who were attending school in Alice Springs.

Background 

Griffiths House was originally designed to be a hostel for young single people who had moved to Alice Springs for work, but by the time it was opened on 5 July 1941, plans had already changed, it was immediately converted in to a social club for soldiers stationed in Alice Springs. This club, which also housed the wives of servicemen permanently stationed in the town, was known as "The Inter-Church Services Club and Hostel".

Following the end of World War II, in 1945, the hostel was turned into Griffiths House with the new purpose of housing children from more remote areas who were attending school in Alice Springs. The Hostel was named Griffiths House after the Reverend Harry Griffiths, and his wife Dorothy, who worked for the Methodist Inland Mission, and were instrumental in both originally building and the re-purposing of the site.

In 1945 a flood of applications were received from families around the region and the first children to move in were Earl Reidy from Henbury Station, Janice Coulson from Aileron Station and two members of the Coulthard family from Kulgera. By 1946 there were 42 children living there from as far away as Wyndham and Darwin and Griffiths House struggled to meet demand. The children living at the hostel attended Hartley Street School or the Our Lady of the Sacred Heart Convent School.

In 1958 a new accommodation block, for senior boys, was built on the site alongside a new kitchen\laundry. This meant that, in 1959, Griffiths House could host 55 children.

From 1961 - 1964 demand for accommodation decreased, partially due to severe drought and, by 1964, numbers were down to 33 (21 boys and 12 girls; 7 of whom were Aboriginal) and this led to its closure in 1965. Over 700 children passed through Griffiths House during its 20 years as a children's home.

From 1965, following the opening of St Philip's College on 4 April, Griffiths House was re-dedicated as a Youth and Fellowship Centre and it was also used as a Sunday School, meeting venue and accommodation for St Philips College staff.

From the 1970, with further expansions, it became low cost rental accommodation and crisis accommodation and a 'bush' family could stay at the hostel for $30 a week rather than pay $20 a night for a hotel. It is estimated that, between 1968 - 1969, 6,000 people used the accommodation. There were often conflicts between residents and the police had to be called  on a regular basis and because of these challenges and with the additional stresses of the constant challenge of maintenance, rising building costs and other accommodation becoming available the decision was made to sell and demolish the complex in 1982. The site was then developed by the Aboriginal Development Corporation and would become a part of the site for the Yeperenye Shopping Centre.

Alternate Names 

 Alice Springs Children's Hostel
 Methodist Children's Hostel

References

External links 
 Find and Connect; "Griffiths House (1945 - 1965)"
 Centre for Indigenous Family History; "St Mary's Hostel, Alice Springs"
 National Archives of Australia; Tracking Family: A Guide to Aboriginal Records Relating to the Northern Territory

Child-related organisations in Australia
Buildings and structures in Alice Springs